Kota is a mandel in Tirupati District in the state of Andhra Pradesh, India. It is the headquarters of the Kota mandal and is known as the political hub of Tirupati District. There is an 19 villages in the Kota mandal.

References

Villages in Tirupati district